Nicholas Beighton (born 29 September 1981) is a British paracanoeist and former British Army officer. Beighton took up rowing as part of the rehabilitation programme after losing his legs during active service. He competed in the mixed scull with partner Samantha Scowen at the 2012 Summer Paralympics in London. He subsequently switched to the paracanoe discipline and won the bronze medal in the Men's KL2 canoe sprint at the 2016 Summer Paralympics in Rio de Janeiro.

Early life and education
Beighton was born in Stockport, England in 1981. At the age of seven his family moved to Shrewsbury where he attended Meole Brace School and later Shrewsbury Sixth Form College before matriculating to Sheffield University.

Career

Military service
Beighton joined the British Army and undertook his officer training at the Royal Military Academy Sandhurst. On 16 December 2000, he was commissioned into the Royal Engineers as a lieutenant with seniority from 13 December 2005. He was promoted to captain on 16 June 2009. 

In October 2009, while on patrol in Helmand Province in Afghanistan, Beighton stood on an improvised explosive device. His life was saved by an Army Medic, who kept him stable before being taken to medical facilities in Camp Bastion. Beighton was placed in a medically induced coma and required 36 pints of blood during his initial treatment. Although his life was saved he lost both his legs in the attack.

Sporting career
In February 2010, Beighton attended a Paralympic talent identification day at Brunel University. It was there that he became aware that the British Paralympic squad were looking for a male Trunk and Arms rower. He first sculled in July 2010 at Guildford Rowing Club as part of the rehabilitation programme at the Defence Medical Rehabilitation Centre. In April 2011, Beighton joined the Great Britain rowing team, and in May he was paired with Sam Scowen in the TA mixed Double Scull at the world cup in Munich. They finished third to take the bronze. In August, Beighton travelled to Slovenia to compete in the 2011 World Rowing Championships, where he and Scowen finished 6th. In 2011, Beighton and Scowen were the first rowers to qualify for the 2012 Summer Paralympics in London. They finished fourth at the London 2012 Paralympics, on the losing end of a photo finish for the bronze medal.

Beighton subsequently became a member of the British paracanoe squad and competed at the 2016 Summer Paralympics in Rio de Janeiro where he won the bronze medal in the Men's KL2 canoe sprint.

References

1981 births
Living people
Sportspeople from Stockport
English male rowers
British male canoeists
Paralympic rowers of Great Britain
Paracanoeists of Great Britain
Paralympic medalists in paracanoe
Paralympic bronze medalists for Great Britain
Rowers at the 2012 Summer Paralympics
Paracanoeists at the 2016 Summer Paralympics
Medalists at the 2016 Summer Paralympics
Alumni of the University of Sheffield
Royal Engineers officers
British Army personnel of the War in Afghanistan (2001–2021)